Sauvagesia brevipetala is a species of plant in the family Ochnaceae. It is endemic to Ecuador.

References

Ochnaceae
Flora of Ecuador
Vulnerable plants
Taxonomy articles created by Polbot